Pelverata Falls is a  waterfall in the Snug Tiers, Southern Tasmania. In winter and spring the falls are a spectacular sight and have heaps of water coming over them, however, in summer the falls slows to a trickle and sometimes even dries up completely. The track to Pelverata Falls takes approximately 2 hours return, and also allows you to see Slippery Falls from across the gorge near Pelverata Falls.

Geography of Tasmania
Waterfalls of Tasmania